The Bahamas women's national football team is the national women's football team of the Bahamas and is overseen by the Bahamas Football Association. It played six matches and lost all. It has never qualified for a World Cup or any other tournament.

Results and fixtures

The following is a list of match results in the last 12 months, as well as any future matches that have been scheduled.

Legend

2000

2002

2021

Coaching staff

Current coaching staff

Manager history

Players

Current squad
The following players were called up for the match against Cayman Islands on 29 July 2021.

Competitive record

FIFA Women's World Cup

*Draws include knockout matches decided on penalty kicks.

Olympic Games

*Draws include knockout matches decided on penalty kicks.

CONCACAF W Championship

*Draws include knockout matches decided on penalty kicks.

CFU Women's Caribbean Cup

*Draws include knockout matches decided on penalty kicks.

FIFA world rankings
The Bahamas women's national football team has never been ranked by FIFA.

References

Caribbean women's national association football teams
women